Şağlakücə (also, Şağlaküçə, Shaglazuza, and Shavlazuza) is a village and municipality in the Lankaran Rayon of Azerbaijan.  It has a population of 3,873.  The municipality consists of the villages of Şağlakücə and Ballabur.

References 

Populated places in Lankaran District